Neohaustator is a genus of sea snails, marine gastropod mollusks in the family Turritellidae.

Species
Species within the genus Neohaustator include:
 Neohaustator andenensis (Otuka, 1934)
 Neohaustator fortilirata (G. B. Sowerby III, 1914)

References

Turritellidae